Cléber Nelson de Andrade Raphaelli (born 13 May 1974), known as Cléber Gaúcho, is a Brazilian football manager and former player who played as a defensive midfielder.

Honours

Player
XV de Piracicaba
Campeonato Brasileiro Série C: 1995

Criciúma
Campeonato Brasileiro Série B: 2002
Copa do Brasil: 2004
Campeonato Catarinense: 2005

Goiás
Campeonato Goiano: 2006

Manager
XV de Piracicaba
Copa Paulista: 2016

Velo Clube
Campeonato Paulista Série A3: 2020

Grêmio Anápolis
Campeonato Goiano: 2021

External links
 
 

1974 births
Living people
Brazilian footballers
Association football midfielders
Grêmio Esportivo Brasil players
Esporte Clube XV de Novembro (Piracicaba) players
Paulista Futebol Clube players
Rio Branco Esporte Clube players
União Agrícola Barbarense Futebol Clube players
Sociedade Esportiva e Recreativa Caxias do Sul players
Clube 15 de Novembro players
Criciúma Esporte Clube players
Esporte Clube Santo André players
Goiás Esporte Clube players
Rio Claro Futebol Clube players
Sociedade Esportiva do Gama players
Brazilian football managers
Esporte Clube XV de Novembro (Piracicaba) managers
Esporte Clube Rio Verde managers
União Agrícola Barbarense Futebol Clube managers
Associação Esportiva Velo Clube Rioclarense managers
Sertãozinho Futebol Clube managers
Grêmio Esportivo Anápolis managers
Grêmio Esportivo Brasil managers
Pouso Alegre Futebol Clube managers